Mueang Sing may refer to:

Mueang Sing, Laos, Luang Namtha Province, Laos
Mueang Sing historical park, Kanchanaburi province, Thailand
Mueang Sing, historical province of Siam, precursor of today's Sing Buri Province, Thailand
Mueang Sing, historical province of Siam, precursor of today's Sing subdistrict, Sai Yok, Kanchanaburi province, Thailand